Iamo Ila (born 1948) is a former Papua New Guinea international lawn bowler.

Bowls career
Ila has represented Papua New Guinea at two Commonwealth Games; in the fours at the 1994 Commonwealth Games and in the singles at the 1998 Commonwealth Games.

He won a bronze medal at the 1995 Asia Pacific Bowls Championships, in the triples in Dunedin.

References

1948 births
Living people
Bowls players at the 1994 Commonwealth Games
Bowls players at the 1998 Commonwealth Games
Papua New Guinean male bowls players